is a public university with campuses in Chuo-ku and Minami-ku, Sapporo, Japan.  The predecessor of the school was established in 1991, and it was chartered as a university in 2006 when it merged with a nursing school.

External links
 Official website 

Educational institutions established in 1991
Public universities in Japan
Universities and colleges in Sapporo
1991 establishments in Japan